Balrath is a townland in County Westmeath, Ireland.

Balrath is one of 8 townlands of the civil parish of Portloman in the barony of Corkaree in the Province of Leinster. The neighbouring townlands are: Mountmurray to the north and east, Wattstown to the south, 
Ballyedward to the south–west, Piercefield or Templeoran to the west and Grangegeeth to the north–west. Part of the eastern boundary of the townland is formed by the shoreline of Lough Owel, opposite Glassford Island.

In the 1911 census of Ireland there were 7 houses and 17 inhabitants in the townland; 2 of the houses were unoccupied.

References

External links
Map of Balrath at openstreetmap.org
Balrath at The IreAtlas Townland Data Base
Balrath at Townlands.ie
Balrath at Logainm.ie

Townlands of County Westmeath